Philippe Gilbert (born 5 July 1982) is a Belgian former professional road bicycle racer, who is best known for winning the World Road Race Championships in 2012, and for being one of two riders, along with Davide Rebellin, to have won the three Ardennes classics – the Amstel Gold Race, La Flèche Wallonne and Liège–Bastogne–Liège – in a single season, which he accomplished in 2011. Gilbert also finished the 2011 season as the overall winner of the UCI World Tour.

A Classics specialist, Gilbert has won several classic cycle races, including Paris–Tours twice (2008, 2009), the Giro di Lombardia twice (2009, 2010), the Amstel Gold Race four times (2010, 2011, 2014, 2017), La Flèche Wallonne (2011), Liège–Bastogne–Liège (2011), the Clásica de San Sebastián (2011), the Tour of Flanders (2017), and Paris–Roubaix (2019). He is the second person (and first Belgian) in history to win all three Ardennes classics in a single year. In 2017, Gilbert became the third rider after Eddy Merckx (1975) and Jan Raas (1979) to win both the Tour of Flanders and the Amstel Gold Race in the same year.

He has also won stages at each of the three cycling Grand Tours: three stages at the Giro d'Italia (one in 2009 and two in 2015), one stage at the Tour de France (in 2011), and seven stages at the Vuelta a España (two in both 2010 and 2012, one in 2013 and two in 2019).

Gilbert retired as a professional, after the 2022 Paris–Tours.  He celebrated his retirement in Valkenburg aan de Geul where he became world champion and won four Amstel Gold Races. He was honoured with a mural in the caves of the Cauberg.

Personal life
Gilbert currently resides in Monaco. With his ex-wife Patricia Zevaert he has two sons, born 2010 and 2013.

Gilbert's younger brother Jérôme has also been a racing cyclist.

Gilbert committed to serve world peace through sport by joining Peace and Sport.

During the 2021 UCI Road World Championships in Flanders, he was elected to a four-year term as a representative for road cycling on the Union Cycliste Internationale Athletes' Commission, winning 66 percent of the vote.

Career

FDJeux.com (2003–08)

First three seasons
Born in Remouchamps in the municipality of Aywaille, Gilbert turned professional in 2003 by joining  after riding as stagiaire for the team in late 2000. During this season he recorded his first victory by winning a stage in the Tour de l'Avenir. In 2004 he began by winning a stage in the Tour Down Under as well as the young rider classification. He participated in the Cycling at the 2004 Summer Olympics – Men's individual road race at the 2004 Summer Olympics where he finished 49th. He also won the Paris–Corrèze. In 2005 he won several races in France, which allowed him to win the Coupe de France de cyclisme sur route. These victories included the Trophée des Grimpeurs, the Tour du Haut Var and the Polynormande. He also took stages in the Four Days of Dunkirk and the Tour Méditerranéen.

2006 season

During the season he also won the Grand Prix de Fourmies and the Grand Prix de Wallonie as well as stages at the Critérium du Dauphiné Libéré and the Eneco Tour.

2007 season

In early 2007 he had a skin cancer lesion removed from his thigh, delaying the start of his season. That did not stop him from trying himself during Milan–San Remo, where he managed to escape on the Poggio with Riccardo Riccò before being captured  from the finishing line. He could not get any victory during the season until the Tour du Limousin, where he claimed his only victory in 2007 by winning a stage.

2008 season

Gilbert started 2008 by winning the King of the Mountains competition at the Tour Down Under and the overall classification as well as two stages of the Vuelta a Mallorca. He also finished third in Milan–San Remo, accomplishing his first podium in a monument. He later won Omloop Het Volk for the second time in his career after a solo attack with almost  to go. Four days later he won the GP Samyn. He finished the year by winning the classic Paris–Tours race in a late breakaway where he won a sprint between his three breakaway companions. The peloton finished four seconds back.

Silence–Lotto (2009–11)

2009 season
In 2009 he joined  to lead the Belgian team in the classics, finishing third at the Tour of Flanders and fourth in both the Amstel Gold Race and Liège–Bastogne–Liège. He also took his first stage in a Grand Tour by winning the 20th stage of the Giro d'Italia and won a stage and the overall classification of the Ster Elektrotoer. Later in the season he repeated his Paris–Tours win, attacking on the last climb with Tom Boonen and Borut Božič before outsprinting them to the line. A week later, he also won the prestigious Giro di Lombardia after escaping from the peloton with Samuel Sánchez, beating him to the finish by a half-length. It was his fourth victory in 10 days after also winning the Coppa Sabatini and Giro del Piemonte. At the end of the season he was awarded the Flandrien of the Year award, recognising him as the best Belgian rider of the year.

2010 season
In 2010 he won his first classic of the year, April's Amstel Gold Race. After an aggressive race featuring many attacks, he won through a big attack in the last  of the climb to the finish, comfortably winning by several bike lengths from the peloton. He also won the first stage of the Tour of Belgium. Gilbert then ended the 2010 season in superb form. He followed up two stage wins in the Vuelta a España with victories in the Giro del Piemonte and the Giro di Lombardia, repeating his 2009 wins in both races. The Giro di Lombardia was won with a solo attack in atrocious weather conditions.

2011 season
In 2011, Gilbert won the Montepaschi Strade Bianche, a race including  of gravel roads. He then had a quadruple consecutive win: first he won the Brabantse Pijl, then he repeated as winner of the Amstel Gold Race, breaking free on the Cauberg. Three days later, he won La Flèche Wallonne dropping his rivals on the final climb of the Mur de Huy and finally he won Liège–Bastogne–Liège beating the Schleck brothers in the sprint. Gilbert thus became the second rider, after Davide Rebellin in 2004, to win the three Ardennes classics in a single year. During the first half of the season he also won stages at the Volta ao Algarve, Tirreno–Adriatico as well as the overall classification and a stage of both the Tour of Belgium and Ster ZLM Toer.

In late June, Gilbert won the Belgian National Road Race Championships. In July he won the opening  stage of the Tour de France, winning by three seconds over Cadel Evans, allowing him to be the first person to put on the yellow jersey as overall leader. He lost that jersey in the team time trial the next day but still held the green and polka dot jerseys after stage two. A week after the end of the Tour, Gilbert won the Clásica de San Sebastián, and in mid-August, Gilbert won the 3rd stage at the Eneco Tour, taking his 15th victory of the year.

In September, Gilbert won the Grand Prix Cycliste de Québec and took over the lead of the UCI world rankings with the 80 points awarded to the victor. He followed that performance two days later at the Grand Prix Cycliste de Montréal by finishing third, despite stating that he felt "no pressure" after his Quebec City victory. With that placing, Gilbert deposited another 50 UCI points in his account. He would race in the October Italian classic, the Giro di Lombardia, taking eighth place after he was distanced on the final climb. He eventually closed the season well ahead in the UCI World Tour rankings, with 718 points to the 584 points of his closest competitor, Cadel Evans. He won 18 races in the season, more than any other cyclist in the professional peloton.

Gilbert was appointed as a member of the inaugural UCI Athletes' Commission in 2011.

BMC Racing Team (2012–16)

2012 season

His goals for his new squad were to perform highly in the Spring classics and help his team-mate Cadel Evans repeat his 2011 feat of winning the Tour de France. Neither of those came to fruition, as Gilbert's best result in the one-day spring races was third at La Flèche Wallonne, where he got deposited on the final climb by Joaquim Rodríguez who won atop the historic Mur de Huy with a slim margin of 4 seconds. Three days prior, he took sixth position at the Amstel Gold Race and was pleased to achieve a top ten ranking in the Ardennes race. He missed out on his goal to bring Evans in yellow to Paris and his best placing in a Tour de France stage was fourth. He also lost both of the Belgian National Championship titles he held, finishing third in the Belgian National Time Trial Championships.

On 26 August 2012, Gilbert finally managed his first victory of the season by winning the ninth stage of the Vuelta a España after breaking away together with Rodríguez. He later won a second stage of the race, winning stage nineteen on 7 September.

On 23 September 2012, Gilbert won the UCI Elite Men's Road Race world championship and the rainbow jersey, ahead of Edvald Boasson Hagen and Alejandro Valverde by producing a massive surge on the final climb of the Cauberg.

2013 season

In 2013, Gilbert headed towards the World Championships without a single win in the rainbow jersey, in danger of his first winless season since turning professional in 2003. He started the Vuelta a España hoping that the competition would, for the second successive year, kick-start his season. After being narrowly defeated in a sprint by Zdeněk Štybar on stage 7, Gilbert finally clinched a victory in the rainbow stripes when he caught and passed Edvald Boasson Hagen to win stage 12.

2014 season
In 2014, Gilbert picked up his previous form when in the spring he won his second Brabantse Pijl and his third Amstel Gold Race.

2015 season

Gilbert finished third at Brabantse Pijl, seconds after his teammate Ben Hermans. At the Amstel Gold Race, Gilbert could not repeat his winning ways of 2014 and came in tenth after having attacked on the final climb of the day, the Cauberg. On the next Wednesday, Gilbert crashed out of La Flèche Wallonne. He then took part in Liège–Bastogne–Liège even though he was slightly injured and held on to the main group until the Côte de Saint-Nicolas, where he was dropped and finished 36th. He scored his first victory of the season at the Giro d'Italia, besting the lead group on a sharp incline at the end of Stage 12. He repeated on Stage 18, where he participated in the early break. After being dropped on the last climb of the day, he came back to the remnants of the breakaway after the descent and attacked them to win solo.

2016 season
Gilbert took his first victory of the season in February at the one-day race Vuelta a Murcia, winning the sprint of a four-man group. He won the Belgian National Road Race Championships in June.

Quick-Step Floors (2017–19)

2017 season

After 5 seasons with BMC, Gilbert joined  for the 2017 season. Gilbert finished second in the Dwars door Vlaanderen behind teammate Yves Lampaert. The pair made the race-defining split along with Alexey Lutsenko from the  team, and 's Luke Durbridge. Lampaert attacked with  remaining and ultimately won the race by 39 seconds ahead of Gilbert, who led home Lutsenko and Durbridge in a sprint for second place. Later that week, in a three-up sprint finish of Belgian riders, Greg Van Avermaet won E3 Harelbeke ahead of Gilbert and 's Oliver Naesen. The following week, Gilbert won the Three Days of De Panne after he attacked on the Muur van Geraardsbergen during the race's opening stage and soloed away to the victory by 17 seconds from his nearest competitor. He ultimately won the race by 38 seconds ahead of 's Matthias Brändle, and also won the sprints classification, primarily from his opening-day attack.

Three days later, he won the Tour of Flanders after a solo attack on the Oude Kwaremont and holding off the rest of the field over the remaining . Gilbert became the first rider in twenty years to win both the Tour of Flanders and Liège–Bastogne–Liège in his career. Two weeks after that he won the Amstel Gold Race for a fourth time and became the third rider to win the Tour of Flanders and the Amstel Gold Race in the same year, after Jan Raas and Eddy Merckx. It was later revealed that he won the race despite riding for the last  of the race with a minor kidney tear. The injury required treatment in hospital after the race, and ruled him out of La Flèche Wallonne and Liège–Bastogne–Liège.

2018 season

In Stage 16 of the Tour de France, Gilbert was involved in a crash in a downhill section where he went over a wall, suffering lacerations and fracturing his kneecap. This was the same road where Fabio Casartelli died in the 1995 Tour de France. Gilbert climbed back onto his bike and rode the remaining  to the finish in Bagnères-de-Luchon, earning him the Most Combative Rider award but ending his tour.

2019 season
In April, Gilbert won Paris–Roubaix in a sprint ahead of Nils Politt, thereby raising his total number of monument titles to five. During the Vuelta a España, Gilbert won stage 12 to Bilbao, after dropping his breakaway companions to reach the finish alone. On stage 17 into Guadalajara, Gilbert was again victorious. In a stage marked by crosswinds, his team forced the pace and allowed him to win the sprint finish.

Lotto–Soudal
In August 2019, Gilbert signed a three-year contract with the  team from the 2020 season onwards.

Career achievements

Major results

2000
 10th Overall Giro della Lunigiana
2002
 2nd Road race, National Under-23 Road Championships
 2nd Overall Tour du Loir-et-Cher
1st Stage 6
 4th Ronde van Vlaanderen U23
 5th Overall Le Triptyque des Monts et Châteaux
 6th Grand Prix de Waregem
 7th Tour du Finistère
 8th Circuit de Wallonie
 9th Road race, UCI Under-23 Road World Championships
 9th La Côte Picarde
2003
 2nd Tro-Bro Léon
 4th Overall Tour de l'Avenir
1st  Points classification
1st Stage 9
 6th Overall Driedaagse van West-Vlaanderen
 10th Trophée des Grimpeurs
2004
 1st  Overall Paris–Corrèze
 2nd Trophée des Grimpeurs
 2nd Paris–Brussels
 2nd Grand Prix de Wallonie
 3rd Overall Ster Elektrotoer
 4th Overall Tour Down Under
1st Stage 3
 9th Overall Regio-Tour
2005
 1st French Road Cycling Cup
 1st Trophée des Grimpeurs
 1st Tour du Haut Var
 1st Polynormande
 1st Stage 2 Tour Méditerranéen
 2nd Grand Prix de Wallonie
 6th Milan–San Remo
 8th Overall Four Days of Dunkirk
1st Stage 4
 8th Grand Prix d'Isbergues
2006
 1st Omloop Het Volk
 1st Grand Prix de Wallonie
 1st Grand Prix de Fourmies
 1st Stage 2 Critérium du Dauphiné Libéré
 2nd Road race, National Road Championships
 2nd Grand Prix d'Ouverture La Marseillaise
 2nd Trophée des Grimpeurs
 2nd Le Samyn
 2nd Grand Prix d'Isbergues
 4th Overall Eneco Tour
1st Stage 7
 9th Paris–Bourges
2007
 1st Stage 1 Tour du Limousin
 National Road Championships
2nd Time trial
3rd Road race
 2nd Le Samyn
 3rd Overall Circuit Franco-Belge
 5th Overall Volta ao Algarve
 7th E3 Prijs Vlaanderen
 7th Grand Prix de Plumelec-Morbihan
 8th Road race, UCI Road World Championships
 10th Boucles de l'Aulne
2008
 1st  Overall Vuelta a Mallorca
1st Trofeo Mallorca
1st Trofeo Sóller
3rd Trofeo Pollença
4th Trofeo Cala
4th Trofeo Calvià
 1st Paris–Tours
 1st Omloop Het Volk
 1st Le Samyn
 1st  Mountains classification, Tour Down Under
 2nd Brabantse Pijl
 3rd Milan–San Remo
 4th Overall Circuit Franco-Belge
 5th Tour du Haut Var
 6th Paris–Bourges
 8th Overall Tour de Picardie
2009
 1st  Overall Ster Elektrotoer
1st Stage 4
 1st Giro di Lombardia
 1st Paris–Tours
 1st Gran Piemonte
 1st Coppa Sabatini
 1st Stage 20 Giro d'Italia
 2nd Road race, National Road Championships
 3rd Tour of Flanders
 4th Amstel Gold Race
 4th Liège–Bastogne–Liège
 6th Road race, UCI Road World Championships
 7th Chrono des Nations
 9th UCI World Ranking
 9th Brabantse Pijl
2010
 1st Giro di Lombardia
 1st Amstel Gold Race
 1st Gran Piemonte
 Vuelta a España
1st Stages 3 & 19
Held  after Stages 3–7
 2nd UCI World Ranking
 2nd Road race, National Road Championships
 3rd Gent–Wevelgem
 3rd Tour of Flanders
 3rd Liège–Bastogne–Liège
 4th Overall Tour of Belgium
1st Stage 1
 5th Brabantse Pijl
 6th La Flèche Wallonne
 7th Overall Tour of Qatar
 9th Milan–San Remo
 9th Halle–Ingooigem
2011
 1st UCI World Tour
 National Road Championships
1st  Road race
1st  Time trial
 1st  Overall Tour of Belgium
1st Stage 3
 1st  Overall Ster ZLM Toer
1st Stage 4
 1st Liège–Bastogne–Liège
 1st Amstel Gold Race
 1st La Flèche Wallonne
 1st Clásica de San Sebastián
 1st Grand Prix Cycliste de Québec
 1st Montepaschi Strade Bianche
 1st Brabantse Pijl
 1st Grand Prix de Wallonie
 Tour de France
1st Stage 1
Held  after Stage 1
 1st Stage 1 Volta ao Algarve
 2nd Overall Eneco Tour
1st Stage 3
 3rd Milan–San Remo
 3rd Grand Prix Cycliste de Montréal
 8th Giro di Lombardia
 9th Overall Tirreno–Adriatico
1st Stage 5
 9th Tour of Flanders
2012
 UCI Road World Championships
1st  Road race
2nd  Team time trial
 Vuelta a España
1st Stages 9 & 19
 3rd Time trial, National Road Championships
 3rd La Flèche Wallonne
 6th Amstel Gold Race
 7th Overall Tour of Belgium
2013
 1st Stage 12 Vuelta a España
 2nd Time trial, National Road Championships
 2nd Brabantse Pijl
 3rd Overall Tour of Belgium
 5th Amstel Gold Race
 5th Grand Prix d'Isbergues
 7th Liège–Bastogne–Liège
 9th Road race, UCI Road World Championships
 10th Grand Prix de Wallonie
2014
 1st  Overall Ster ZLM Toer
1st Prologue & Stage 3
 1st  Overall Tour of Beijing
1st Stage 2
 1st Brabantse Pijl
 1st Amstel Gold Race
 1st  Mountains classification, Tour de Picardie
 3rd Classic Sud-Ardèche
 4th Time trial, National Road Championships
 4th Overall Tour of Belgium
1st  Points classification
 4th London–Surrey Classic
 6th Grand Prix of Aargau Canton
 7th Road race, UCI Road World Championships
 7th Overall Eneco Tour
 7th Giro di Lombardia
 8th Roma Maxima
 8th Liège–Bastogne–Liège
 9th La Drôme Classic
 10th La Flèche Wallonne
2015
 1st Grand Prix Pino Cerami
 Giro d'Italia
1st Stages 12 & 18
 2nd Overall Tour du Haut Var
1st  Points classification
 2nd Clásica de San Sebastián
 3rd Brabantse Pijl
 4th Overall Eneco Tour
 7th Overall Tour de Wallonie
1st Stage 3
 7th Grand Prix Cycliste de Québec
 8th Overall Dubai Tour
 8th Omloop Het Nieuwsblad
 9th Grand Prix Cycliste de Montréal
 10th Road race, UCI Road World Championships
 10th Amstel Gold Race
2016
 1st  Road race, National Road Championships
 1st Vuelta a Murcia
 2nd Overall Tour de Luxembourg
1st  Points classification
1st Stages 2 & 4
 3rd Volta Limburg Classic
 6th Overall Dubai Tour
 6th Tre Valli Varesine
 6th Gran Piemonte
 8th Road race, UEC European Road Championships
 8th Overall Arctic Race of Norway
2017
 1st  Overall Three Days of De Panne
1st  Sprints classification
1st Stage 1
 1st Tour of Flanders
 1st Amstel Gold Race
 1st Stage 2 Tour de Suisse
 1st  Combination classification, Volta a la Comunitat Valenciana
 2nd Dwars door Vlaanderen
 2nd E3 Harelbeke
 4th Overall Tour of Belgium
 9th Overall BinckBank Tour
  Combativity award Stage 5 Tour de France
2018
 1st Grand Prix d'Isbergues
 2nd Road race, National Road Championships
 2nd Le Samyn
 2nd E3 Harelbeke
 3rd Tour of Flanders
 3rd Vuelta a Murcia
 5th Omloop Het Nieuwsblad
 8th Paris–Tours
  Combativity award Stage 16 Tour de France
2019
 1st Paris–Roubaix
 Vuelta a España
1st Stages 12 & 17
 Combativity award Stage 12
 3rd Halle–Ingooigem
 4th Road race, National Road Championships
 8th Omloop Het Nieuwsblad
 10th Overall Tour de la Provence
1st Stage 3
2020
 8th Omloop Het Nieuwsblad
 9th Milan–San Remo
2021
 4th Brussels Cycling Classic
 5th Omloop Het Nieuwsblad
 9th Druivenkoers Overijse
2022
 1st  Overall Four Days of Dunkirk
1st Stage 3
 6th Binche–Chimay–Binche
 8th Tour du Doubs
 10th Volta Limburg Classic

Grand Tour general classification results timeline

Classics results
This table shows Gilbert's results in the great classics.

Major championships timeline

Awards and honours 
 Crystal Bicycle: 2008, 2009, 2010, 2011
 Sprint d'Or: 2008
 Belgian Sportsman of the year: 2009, 2010, 2011
 Belgian National Sports Merit Award: 2009
 Crystal Bicycle: 2008, 2009, 2010, 2011
 Flandrien Award: 2009, 2010, 2011
 AIJC trophy: 2009
 Walloon-Brussels Sports Merit Award: 2010, 2011, 2012
 Vélo d'Or Mondial: 2011
 Mendrisio d'Or: 2012
 Square Philippe Gilbert in Aywaille: 2013
 Honorary Citizen of Valkenburg: 2016
 Ruban Jaune: 2019
 CyclingRanking – Overall ranking (12th place)

Controversies

Notes

References

Further reading

External links

 
 
 
 
 
 
 

1982 births
Living people
People from Verviers
Belgian male cyclists
Olympic cyclists of Belgium
Cyclists at the 2004 Summer Olympics
Cyclists at the 2012 Summer Olympics
Cyclists at the 2016 Summer Olympics
Belgian Tour de France stage winners
Belgian Giro d'Italia stage winners
Belgian Vuelta a España stage winners
UCI Road World Champions (elite men)
2011 Tour de France stage winners
Cyclists from Liège Province
UCI World Tour winners
Tour de Suisse stage winners